Side Orders (lit. "Duck's Liver and Woman's Heart") is a 2001 Canadian drama short film written and directed by Stéphane Lapointe. The film stars Suzanne Clément as Hélène, a woman whose boyfriend Jérôme (Christian Bégin) is a manipulative jerk.

The film received a Genie Award nomination for Best Live Action Short Drama at the 22nd Genie Awards in 2002. In advance of the Genie Award ceremony on February 7, it was screened at the Bloor Cinema on January 27, as the opening film to a screening of the Best Picture nominee Eisenstein.

References

External links
 

2001 films
2001 drama films
2001 short films
2000s Canadian films
2000s French-language films
Canadian drama short films
French-language Canadian films